Prismatomeris fragrans is a species of tree in the Rubiaceae family. It is found in Southeast Asia. The subspecies Prismatomeris fragrans subsp. andamanica is found only on the Andaman Islands.

Taxonomy
There is are two accepted subspecies, the autonym Prismatomeris fragrans subsp. fragrans and Prismatomeris fragrans subsp. andamanica.

Distribution
It is native to Southeast Asia. Countries and regions in which it grows are: Vietnam; Laos; Thailand; and the Andaman Islands, India. The autonym subspecies is limited to the mainland Southeast Asia, while the andamanica subspecies is endemic to the Andaman Islands.

References

fragrans
Flora of Laos
Flora of Thailand
Flora of the Andaman Islands
Flora of Vietnam
Taxonomy articles created by Polbot
Taxobox binomials not recognized by IUCN